The 1999–2000 season was the 51st season in the existence of UD Las Palmas and the club's fourth consecutive season in the second division of Spanish football. The season covered the period from 1 July 1999 to 30 June 2000.

Transfers

In

Out

Pre-season and friendlies

Competitions

Overall record

Segunda División

League table

Results summary

Results by round

Matches

Copa del Rey

First round

Second round

References

UD Las Palmas seasons
Las Palmas